Noitgedacht also Nooitgedacht (Dutch for 'Never Thought') is one of the villages on the island of Wakenaam, Guyana. It is populated mainly by small farmers. The main access to this section of the island is by ferry/speedboat from the Essequibo coast.

Another village called Noitgedacht is situated in Upper Demerara, in the Town of Linden. It was once owned by the Dutch family De Nieuwerks, later by the family Allicocks and eventually it became property of Alcan of Canada.

References

External links 
http://www.guyana.org/special/community.html

Populated places in Essequibo Islands-West Demerara